For Now is the second album by Australian indie rock band DMA's, released on 27 April 2018.

The album was supported by seven singles: "Dawning", "In the Air", "For Now", "Break Me" "Do I Need You Now?", "The End", and "Time & Money".

At the ARIA Music Awards of 2018, the album was nominated for three awards; Best Group, Best Rock Album and Best Independent Release.

At the J Awards of 2018, the album was nominated for Australian Album of the Year.

Four tracks from the album were voted into consecutive Triple J Hottest 100 countdowns, "Dawning" in 2017 at number 89, and "In the Air", "The End" and "Do I Need You Now?" in 2018 at numbers 40, 61, and 97, respectively. "Time & Money" also came in at #198 in Triple J's Hottest 200 of 2018.

Track listing

Personnel
Credits adapted from AllMusic.

 Tom Crandles – bass guitar
 DMA's – engineering, production
 Andrea Ficara – additional production
 Joel Flyger – guitar
 Joanna Frank – design
 Paddy Harrowsmith – guitar
 Liam Hoskins – drums
 Charlie Mann – additional production
 Kim Moyes – drums, engineering, production
 Jack Nigro – engineering
 Spike Stent – mixing
 Luke Stephenson – photography
 Dan Strong – drum programming
 Mike Tucci – mastering

Charts

References

2018 albums
DMA's albums
Infectious Music albums